50 Fremont Center (also known as Salesforce West) is a 43-story,  high-rise office building completed in 1985 at Fremont and Mission Streets on the boundary of the financial district and South of Market Area (SOMA) of San Francisco, California. The stepped-back facade design of the building resembles Eliel Saarinen's Tribune Tower design.

History
50 Fremont Street was developed and owned by Fremont Properties who sold the building in 2000, which was later purchased by Hines Interests Limited Partnership, who in turn sold the property to TIAA-CREF in late 2004. Hines provided property management for this building until February 12, 2015.  The building's design, by Skidmore, Owings & Merrill, includes stepped-back vertical bays at each corner, rising to a building crown that evokes the design of historic Art Deco skyscrapers.

In January 2012, Salesforce.com announced that it signed an 18-year lease to occupy  for  million. In November 2014, Salesforce agreed to purchase the tower from TIAA-CREF.

On February 12, 2015, Salesforce purchased the 50 Fremont office building for $637.8 million from TIAA-CREF, according to public records. Salesforce rebranded the property as Salesforce West at 50 Fremont Street, part of their urban campus plan that includes Salesforce East at 350 Mission Street and Salesforce Tower at 415 Mission Street. Salesforce West is currently managed by Cushman & Wakefield.

Tenants 
 Salesforce.com
 Mellon Capital Management
 Baker Tilly
 City National Bank
 Univision

See also

 San Francisco's tallest buildings

References

External links
 

Office buildings completed in 1985
Skyscraper office buildings in San Francisco
Hines Interests Limited Partnership
Skidmore, Owings & Merrill buildings
Financial District, San Francisco
South of Market, San Francisco
Leadership in Energy and Environmental Design platinum certified buildings
1985 establishments in California